Lumen gentium, the Dogmatic Constitution on the Church, is one of the principal documents of the Second Vatican Council. This dogmatic constitution was promulgated by Pope Paul VI on 21 November 1964, following approval by the assembled bishops by a vote of 2,151 to 5. As is customary with significant Roman Catholic Church documents, it is known by its incipit, "Lumen gentium", Latin for "Light of the Nations".

The eight chapters of the document can be paired thematically: chapters one and two treat the church's nature and historical existence, chapters three and four treat different roles in the church, chapters five and six treat holiness and religious life, while chapters seven and eight discuss the saints and Mary.

Contents

Chapter 1: The Mystery of the Church (1-8)
In its first chapter on ecclesiology, the constitution states that "all the just, from Adam and 'from Abel, the just one, to the last of the elect,' will be gathered together with the Father in the universal Church, ... a people made one with the unity of the Father, the Son and the Holy Spirit."(2) "Christ made His brothers, called together from all nations, mystically the components of His own Body."(7)

It goes on to describe "the sole Church of Christ which in the Creed is professed as one, holy, catholic and apostolic, which our Saviour, after His Resurrection, commissioned Peter to shepherd, and him and the other apostles to extend and direct with authority, which He erected for all ages as 'the pillar and mainstay of the truth.' This Church, constituted and organized as a society in the present world, subsists in the Catholic Church, which is governed by the successor of Peter and by the bishops in communion with him, although many elements of sanctification and of truth are found outside its visible confines." (8)

Pope Francis has taken a central theme of his pontificate from Lumen Gentium § 8 on the Church following Christ in his poverty and humility in order to bring the Good News to the poor.

Chapter 2: On The People of God (9-17)

Church is the people of God
One of the key portions of Lumen gentium is its second chapter, with its declaration that the Church is "the People of God":

Common and ministerial priesthoods

The three-fold ministry of Christ is also exercised by every baptized. Thus in a sense all the baptized share in the priesthood of Christ: 
Though they differ from one another in essence and not only in degree, the common priesthood of the faithful and the ministerial or hierarchical priesthood are nonetheless interrelated: each of them in its own special way is a participation in the one priesthood of Christ. The ministerial priest, by the sacred power he enjoys, teaches and rules the priestly people; acting in the person of Christ, he makes present the eucharistic sacrifice, and offers it to God in the name of all the people. But the faithful, in virtue of their royal priesthood, join in the offering of the Eucharist. They likewise exercise that priesthood in receiving the sacraments, in prayer and thanksgiving, in the witness of a holy life, and by self-denial and active charity.(10)

Possibility of salvation outside the Church
In the second chapter, the Council teaches that God wills to save people not just as individuals but as a people. For this reason God chose the Israelite people to be his own people and established a covenant with it, as a preparation and figure of the covenant ratified in Christ that constitutes the new People of God, which would be one, not according to the flesh, but in the Spirit and which is called the Church of Christ.(9)

Only those who "knowing that the Catholic Church was made necessary by Christ, would refuse to enter or to remain in it, could not be saved."(14)

All human beings are called to belong to the Church. Not all are fully incorporated into the Church, but "the Church recognizes that in many ways she is linked with those who, being baptized, are honored with the name of Christian, though they do not profess the faith in its entirety or do not preserve unity of communion with the successor of Peter."(15) In addition, the Church declares the possibility of Salvation for non-Christians and even non-theists:

New Evangelization
The New Evangelization message in the Catholic Church is rooted in LG 17 and is one of the signs that the Church is seeking to fulfill Lumen Gentium. As the Father sent the Son, so He too sent the Apostles .

Chapter 3: The Hierarchical Structure of the Church and In Particular on the Episcopate (18-29)
The third chapter of the document, which spoke of the bishops as a "college"(22) that, within the Church, succeeds to the place of the "college" or "stable group" of the apostles(19) and is "the subject of supreme and full power over the universal Church, provided we understand this body together with its head, the Roman Pontiff."(22)

Conservative bishops in the council were fearful that the idea of the College of Bishops would be interpreted as a new conciliarism, a fifteenth-century idea that an ecumenical council was the supreme authority under Christ in the Catholic Church. Of the members of the council, 322, a substantial minority, voted against any mention whatever in the document of a "college" of bishops), and were now proposing 47 amendments to chapter III. Accordingly, a "Preliminary Note of Explanation" (in Latin, Nota explicativa praevia", often referred to as "the Nota praevia") intended to reconcile them with the text was added on 16 November 1964. The Note reaffirmed that the college of bishops exercises its authority only with the assent of the pope, thus safeguarding the primacy and pastoral independence of the pope.

The Note achieved its purpose: on the following day, 17 November, the No votes against chapter III dropped to 46, a number that may have included some who opposed it because they felt the Preliminary Note of Explanation had weakened the concept of collegiality. In the final vote on 18 November only five of the 2200+ participants voted against the dogmatic constitution as a whole.

The Note is introduced by the following words: "A preliminary note of explanation is being given to the Council Fathers from higher authority, regarding the Modi bearing on Chapter III of the Schema de Ecclesia; the doctrine set forth in Chapter III ought to be explained and understood in accordance with the meaning and intent of this explanatory note." "Higher authority" refers to the Pope, Paul VI, and "the Schema de Ecclesia" to the draft text for the dogmatic constitution Lumen gentium. By "the Modi" is meant the proposals for amendments of that draft text which some of the Council participants had presented.

The Note was thus added by papal authority, consistently with the idea that the consent of the Pope, as head of the College of Bishops was necessary, and that he had the "right to make his consent dependent on an interpretation determined in advance".

The Preliminary Note of Explanation did not in fact alter the value of the statement on collegiality in the text of Lumen gentium: it "strengthened the adherence to the doctrine of the First Vatican Council on the primacy, but it did not subsequently strike out anything from the direct divine origin of the episcopal office and its function, and the responsibility of the College of Bishops for the Universal Church."

Part 4 of the Note reads:

Bishop Christopher Butler, a major contributor to the council and strong proponent of its teachings, finds that the document gives a "reaffirmation" to "a genuine sacramental episcopal collegiality" which was thrown into the background by the premature ending of Vatican I. He goes on to say: This seems to afford the basis for a recovery of the principle that the papacy—and now we must add the episcopate—is not the source of the actual life of the Church, but the coordinator of that life's various and peripheral spontaneities. This principle of subsidiarity is carried through to the point at which the lay Catholic is seen as a genuine creative force in the life of the People of God; and to the further point where it is realised that the whole human family, insofar as good will prevails, is a theatre of the operations of the grace-gifts of the Holy Spirit, and is cooperating in the building up of Christ's kingdom. He concludes that the Church which makes contemporary the saving truth of the gospel "is the sign and the instrument of the unity of the whole human race."

This part of the document also endorsed the revival of the office of deacon as found in the early church, as a permanent vocation rather than a stage through which candidates for the priesthood pass, as had been the case since about the fifth century, and that it should open to married men. It said that:

Chapter 4: The Laity (30-38)

The laity are gathered together in the People of God and make up the Body of Christ under one Head. Whoever they are they are called upon, as living members, to expend all their energy for the growth of the Church and its continuous sanctification... Through their baptism and confirmation all are commissioned to that apostolate by the Lord Himself. Moreover, by the sacraments, especially holy Eucharist, that charity toward God and man which is the soul of the apostolate is communicated and nourished. Now the laity are called in a special way to make the Church present and operative in those places and circumstances where only through them can it become the salt of the earth. (33)
But the Lord wishes to spread His kingdom also by means of the laity, namely, a kingdom of truth and life, a kingdom of holiness and grace, a kingdom of justice, love and peace. (36)

Chapter 5: The Universal Call to Holiness in the Church (39-42) 
This theme was built on in the fifth chapter, which is on "the universal call to holiness":

Chapter 6: The Religious (43-47) 
"The religious state clearly manifests that the Kingdom of God and its needs, in a very special way, are raised above all earthly considerations. Finally it clearly shows all men both the unsurpassed breadth of the strength of Christ the King and the infinite power of the Holy Spirit marvelously working in the Church." It is considered a "deepening of the baptismal character". The religious life is conducive to the building up of other persons and of the world in Christ.

Chapter 7: The Eschatological Nature of the Pilgrim Church and Its Union with the Church in Heaven (48-51) 
This chapter affirms the oneness of the Church on earth with the Church in heaven. It makes an indirect allusion to the future fulfillment of Bible prophecy in history. It continues themes of sanctification and holiness from earlier sections. It affirms the ancient Church practices of remembering the saints and imploring their intercession. It affirms "the sacred Liturgy, wherein the power of the Holy Spirit acts upon us through sacramental signs" and anticipates worship in heaven.

Chapter 8: The Blessed Virgin Mary, Mother of God, in the Mystery of Christ and the Church (52-69) 
The chapter on Mary was the subject of debate. Original plans had called for a separate document about the role of Mary, keeping the document on the Church "ecumenical," in the sense of "non-offensive" to Protestant Christians, who viewed special veneration of Mary with suspicion. However, the Council Fathers insisted, with the support of the Pope, that, as Mary's place is within the Church, treatment of her should appear within the Constitution on the Church.

Vatican Council II was sensitive to the views of other Christians, as the council, at the request of Pope John XXIII, hoped to promote Christian unity, but knew there are different concepts about Mary among other Christians, especially Protestants. The council in its one mention of Mary as "Mediatrix", spoke of her as strengthening — not lessening — confidence in Christ as the one essential Mediator. The council, in speaking of Mary, used a biblical approach, with strong emphasis on her pilgrimage of faith. They also drew heavily from the Fathers of the Church, which Christians of all denominations respect.

Pope Paul VI, in a speech to the council fathers, called the document "a vast synthesis of the Catholic doctrine regarding the place which the Blessed Mary occupies in the mystery of Christ and of the Church."

Bishop Christopher Butler mentions that prior to Vatican II the one area where Catholic theology was allowed to develop uncritically, apart from the total life of theology, was in devotion to Mary, so that "it began to seem that the Catholicism of the future would approximate more and more to the condition of an Italian tribal cult." This century-long drift was brought to an end by the Council on October 29, 1963, "a fixed point of the Marian paradigm shift," the date on which the Council decided, in a very close vote, to not give Mary a separate document but to situate her properly within the larger Church.
...in the most holy Virgin the Church has already reached that perfection whereby she is without spot or wrinkle. (Ephesians 5:27) (65)

Issues surrounding the document

Contributors
Marie Rosaire Gagnebet O.P. (1904-1983) professor of theology at the Pontifical University of St. Thomas Aquinas, Angelicum from 1938 to 1976 and peritus during Vatican II, was influential in the redaction of the Lumen gentium.

Traditionalist reaction
Certain Traditionalist Catholic groups, particularly Sedevacantists, consider Lumen gentium to be the demarcation of when the Roman Church fell into heresy, pointing to the use of "subsistit in" rather than "est" as an abdication of the Church's historic (and to them compulsory) identification of itself alone as God's church. In an interview with the Frankfurter Allgemeine Zeitung, Cardinal Joseph Ratzinger responded to this criticism:

Possibility of salvation outside the Catholic Church
One point of confusion was the document's treatment of the possibility of salvation outside of the Catholic Church. In 2000, Pope John Paul II issued Dominus Iesus with the theme of "the unicity and salvific universality of Jesus Christ and the Church". which affirmed the Church's unique role in salvation, sanctification and mission.
The main controversial affirmation was the Latin expression subsistit in, while defining the living relation between Jesus Christ God and His Church.

See also
 Light unto the nations

References

Further reading

External links
English translation of Lumen gentium on the website of the Holy See

Documents of the Second Vatican Council
1964 documents
Catholic ecclesiology